Anna Maria Cecilia Bonnevie (born 26 September 1973) is a Swedish-Norwegian actress. She was born in Västerås, Sweden, but grew up in Oslo, Norway. Her parents are Norwegian actress Jannik Bonnevie and Swedish actor Per Waldvik. Bonnevie was educated at Swedish National Academy of Mime and Acting (1997) and had her first film role in Hrafn Gunnlaugsson's Hvíti víkingurinn (The White Viking), at the age of sixteen.

Career 
In 1997, she had her debut at the Swedish theatre Dramaten, in the play Yvonne by Ingmar Bergman. Her screen debut was in 1991 in the movie Hviti vikingurinn (The White Viking), directed by Hrafn Gunnlaugsson. Her big breakthrough came with the movie Jerusalem (directed by Bille August, 1997), and among her later movies are Insomnia (1997), Dragonfly (2001) and Syndere i sommersol (2001). For the movie Jeg er Dina (I Am Dina, 2002) she received a prize for best foreign actress at the Montreal International Film Festival. In 2002 she was named one of European film's Shooting Stars by European Film Promotion.

In 1999, she played Olga in The 13th Warrior. In 2004, she appeared in the Swedish film Dag och natt directed by Simon Staho.

In 2007, she played the female lead in the Russian film The Banishment directed by Andrey Zvyagintsev.

The Karlovy Vary International Film Festival (KVIFF) invited Bonnevie to join the Grand Jury of the Festival's 44th edition in 2009.

In 2012, she played Countess Isolde in Belle du Seigneur alongside Jonathan Rhys-Meyers, Natalia Vodianova and Ed Stoppard.

Filmography

References

External links

1973 births
Living people
People from Västerås
Norwegian stage actresses
Norwegian film actresses
20th-century Norwegian actresses
21st-century Norwegian actresses
Norwegian television actresses